Wang Gang (born 11 June 1989) is a Chinese chef and Internet personality. He was born in Fushun County, Zigong, Sichuan, and decided to pursue a culinary career at age 15. He has 5 million followers across Xigua Video, bilibili, Weibo, and YouTube as of 2018, and has been praised for his simple, levelheaded approach to cooking. He specialises in Sichuan cuisine.

Videos
Most of Wang Gang's videos are cookery demonstrations. As a Sichuanese, most of his recipes are authentic Sichuan cuisine. He also teaches Cantonese cuisines he learned as an apprentice in Guangdong. His videos are often straightforward, in no-nonsense and easy-to-understand manner without any special effects or background music. At the beginning of the videos, he introduces the name of the dish with materials in his hand, then moves straight on to the demonstration, where he processes the ingredients, cooks them in a wok and serves the dish. At the end of the videos, he often provides a "technical summary" for the specific dishes.
In contrast to his typically serious attitude towards cooking, he is also famous for his many light-hearted catchphrases, such as "Take it to your enthusiastic butchers", "first, heat up the wok", "add in 'broad oil" (宽油, kuanyou, meaning 'an ample amount of oil'). These catchphrases have often become internet memes.

Wang started to upload vlogs on his life since August 2018. His first vlog contents include teaching his American friend Jerry Kowal how to cook Sichuanese dishes, introducing how to choose woks and kitchen knives, et cetera. In mid-2019, Wang Gang started recording and uploading cookery videos based in his uncle's house in the countryside, featuring his butcher uncle, Wang Baixiu. His uncle is often referred to as "The Beast (火云邪神)" by the fans, owing to his striking resemblance of the homonymous antagonist from movie Kung Fu Hustle — something pointed out by Uncle Roger when he reviewed a video of Wang making egg-fried rice. At the end of his 'countryside' videos, Wang typically invites his uncle/aunt to taste the dishes.

Controversies

In March 2019, Wang attracted controversy for slaughtering and preparing a meal from the endangered giant salamander. He later clarified that the salamander he used was farmed and thus legal to consume.

In October 2020, Wang posted an egg fried rice recipe and was widely denounced by Chinese officials. The timing of the video was seen as a reference to Mao Anying, the son of Mao Zedong who died in the Korean War allegedly because he alerted American bombers to his position when he was cooking fried rice, as the smoke from his cooking attracted the attention of the Americans. Wang was accused of using the video post as a "malicious political innuendo" insulting Mao's legacy. Wang was forced to issue an apology.

References

External links 
 Wang Gang's channel on YouTube
 Wang Gang's channel on Xigua Video
 Wang Gang's channel on bilibili

Living people
1989 births
Chinese YouTubers
People from Zigong
Chinese bloggers
Chinese chefs
Mandarin-language YouTube channels
YouTube channels launched in 2018
Food and cooking YouTubers

YouTubers from Sichuan